Gold(I) cyanide is the inorganic compound with the chemical formula AuCN.  It is the binary cyanide of gold(I). It is an odourless, tasteless yellow solid. Wet gold(I) cyanide is unstable to light and will become greenish. Gold(I) cyanide itself is of only of academic interest, but its derivative dicyanoaurate is an intermediate in gold cyanidation, the extraction of gold from its ores.

Preparation 
Solid gold(I) cyanide precipitates upon reaction of potassium dicyanoaurate with hydrochloric acid:

It can also produced by the reaction of gold(III) chloride and potassium cyanide.

Reactions
The solid dissolves to form water-soluble adducts with a variety of ligands: cyanides, hydroxide, ammonia, thiosulfate and hydrosulfide.

Like most gold compounds, it converts to metallic gold upon heating.

Structure
Gold(I) cyanide's is a coordination polymer consisting of linear chains of AuCN such that each Au(I) center is bonded to carbon and nitrogen. The structure is hexagonal with the lattice parameters a = 3.40 Å and c = 5.09 Å. T

References

Gold(I) compounds
Cyanides